The Nebraska Telephone Company Building is a historic three-story building in Lincoln, Nebraska. It was built in 1894 for the Nebraska Telephone Company, and designed in the Renaissance Revival style by Thomas R. Kimball of Walker & Kimball. From 1912 to 1914, it belonged to the Lincoln Telephone and Telegraph Company, after which it was rented to different companies. It has been listed on the National Register of Historic Places since November 16, 1978.

References

National Register of Historic Places in Lincoln, Nebraska
Renaissance Revival architecture in Nebraska
Commercial buildings completed in 1894
1894 establishments in Nebraska